The New Zealand War Memorial in London is a memorial to the war dead of New Zealand in the First and Second World Wars, unveiled in 2006. Officially named "Southern Stand", the memorial was designed by architect John Hardwick-Smith and sculptor Paul Dibble, both from New Zealand.

It is located on the Piccadilly side of Hyde Park Corner, northeast of the Wellington Arch, and is diagonally opposite the Australian War Memorial. The traffic island also houses an Equestrian statue of the Duke of Wellington, the Machine Gun Corps Memorial and the Royal Artillery Memorial.

Background
The memorial was established to commemorate "the enduring bond between New Zealand and the United Kingdom", and the lives lost by the two countries during the two World Wars. Dibble said:

Thousands of soldiers from New Zealand served with the British Army in South Africa during the Boer War, at Gallipoli and on the Western Front during the First World War, and the Second New Zealand Expeditionary Force served in England, the Middle East and Italy in the Second World War. Hundreds of New Zealanders also served in the Royal Flying Corps, Royal Air Force, and Royal Navy, including the battlecruiser HMS New Zealand and the light cruiser HMS Achilles. Prominent wartime commanders with connections to New Zealand included Bernard Freyberg and Keith Park.

Design
The memorial comprises 16 bronze "standards" set out on a grassy slope at the east end of the Hyde Park Corner traffic island. The dark patinated surfaces of the standards are adorned with different texts, patterns and small sculptures, all symbolic of New Zealand, including fern shapes, a manaia figure, plants and animals from New Zealand, emblems of the New Zealand armed forces, and references to authors and artists from New Zealand.

The girders project from the ground at an angle towards the south. The angle is intended to resemble the posture of warriors performing a haka, or a cricket bat playing a defensive stroke, or the barrel of a shouldered gun. The standards have different heights, with the ends cut off at a diagonal so they resemble cross-like grave markers from a distance.

Nine of the standards form in a regular grid pattern, with a tenth as a leader. The six other standards stand away from the main group in a pattern similar to the Southern Cross, and bear LED lights that can be illuminated. The formal arrangement is intended to resemble a group of soldiers in procession, or Māori pouwhenua markers, or Celtic standing stones.

Richard Shone, editor of The Burlington Magazine, criticised the memorial and its design in an attack on the "infestation of public space", describing it as "bristlingly unlovely".

History
The proposal for a memorial in London was initially made by the government of New Zealand in 2003. In October 2004, 12 design teams were selected from the 68 who submitted expressions of interest in the New Zealand War Memorial. These teams submitted designs for the prospective monument and an expert panel, appointed by the Ministry for Culture and Heritage, selected the final design. The design was then refined and submitted to Westminster City Council in London for planning approval. The design was a collaboration between New Zealand firms Dibble Art Co and Athfield Architects, led by Dibble and Hardwick-Smith respectively, with Jon Rennie as the team's London representative. The budget for the design and construction of the memorial was NZ$3 million.

The official dedication of the New Zealand War Memorial took place on 11 November 2006 (Armistice Day) by Queen Elizabeth II, in her capacity as Queen of New Zealand. In attendance were the Prime Minister of New Zealand Helen Clark and British Prime Minister Tony Blair, as well as the Duke of Edinburgh and other members of the Royal Family, and Lieutenant General Jerry Mateparae, Chief of the New Zealand Defence Force, and Air Chief Marshal Jock Stirrup, Chief of the UK Defence Staff. The ceremony included Hayley Westenra performing God Save the Queen and God Defend New Zealand, the national anthems of the UK and New Zealand, Ngāti Rānana singing a Māori song, "Po Atarau", and the performance of a haka, and also a flypast by an RNZAF Boeing 757 and RAF Typhoons.

See also
List of public art in Hyde Park, London
World War I memorials
 the New Zealand Memorial in Greenwich commemorates the dead of the New Zealand War of 1863–64

References

Military memorials in London
New Zealand military memorials and cemeteries
2006 sculptures
Bronze sculptures in the United Kingdom
New Zealand–United Kingdom military relations
World War I memorials in the United Kingdom
World War II memorials in England